Legislative elections were held in South Korea on 12 December 1978 to elect 154 members of the National Assembly. Another 77 members appointed by President Park Chung-hee were indirectly elected by the National Conference for Unification on 21 December 1978.

Despite garnering 169,000 fewer popular votes than the opposition New Democratic Party, the ruling Democratic Republican Party won a supermajority victory with 68 of the 154 elected seats in the National Assembly and an additional 77 members appointed by President Park. Voter turnout was 77.1%.

Results

By city/province

Presidential appointees 
On 21 December 1978, the National Conference for Unification indirectly elected 77 members of the National Assembly appointed by President Park Chung-hee. Out of the 2,581 delegates, 2,573 were present with 2,539 of them approving the election of Park's appointees.

By city/province

References

South Korea
Legislative elections in South Korea
Legislative